NXT TakeOver: Tampa Bay was a scheduled professional wrestling show and WWE Network event that was to be produced by WWE. It would have been the 29th NXT TakeOver event held exclusively for wrestlers from the promotion's NXT brand division—TakeOver: In Your House in June in turn became the 29th. The event was originally scheduled to take place on April 4, 2020, from the Amalie Arena in Tampa, Florida, but had been postponed due to the COVID-19 pandemic. The event was ultimately canceled, but matches scheduled and planned for the event were rescheduled to take place across multiple episodes of NXT, starting April 1.

Production

Background
TakeOver was a series of professional wrestling shows that began in May 2014, as WWE's NXT brand held their second WWE Network-exclusive event, billed as TakeOver. In subsequent months, the "TakeOver" moniker became the brand used by WWE for all of their NXT live specials. TakeOver: Tampa Bay would have been the 29th NXT TakeOver event (In Your House in June in turn became the 29th). It was titled Tampa Bay as it was to be held in the Tampa Bay area in Florida and it was scheduled to be a support event for WrestleMania 36.

The event was scheduled to take place on April 4, 2020, from the Amalie Arena in Tampa, Florida, however, like WWE's other WrestleMania week events, TakeOver: Tampa Bay was postponed due to the COVID-19 pandemic. On March 24, it was announced that TakeOver: Tampa Bay had been canceled, but matches scheduled and planned for the event were rescheduled to take place across multiple episodes of NXT beginning April 1.

Storylines 

The card would have included matches that resulted from scripted storylines, where wrestlers portrayed heroes, villains, or less distinguishable characters to build tension and culminate in a wrestling match or series of matches, with results predetermined by WWE's writers on the NXT brand, with storylines produced on their weekly television program.

Prior to the event's cancellation, only one match had been confirmed for TakeOver: Tampa Bay. On the February 26 episode of NXT, General Manager William Regal announced that there would be a ladder match at the event to determine the number one contender for the NXT Women's Championship. In addition, he revealed that the participants for the ladder match would be determined through a series of qualifying matches held over several weeks. Chelsea Green, Mia Yim, and Tegan Nox qualified for the match by defeating Shotzi Blackheart, Dakota Kai, and Deonna Purrazzo, respectively. Following the announcement of the event's cancellation, the remaining ladder match participants continued to qualify on NXT.

References

External links
 

2020 American television episodes
Tampa Bay
2020 in professional wrestling
2020 in professional wrestling in Florida
2020 television specials
2020s American television specials
April 2020 events in the United States
Impact of the COVID-19 pandemic on television
Sports events cancelled due to the COVID-19 pandemic